Mustapha ibn Muhieddine (1814–1863), known as Emir Mustapha, Sidi Moustafa, Moustafa El Hassani El Djazairi, was an Algerian religious and military leader who led a struggle against the French colonial invasion in the mid-19th century with his brother, Emir Abdelkader.

Family

Mustapha was one of Mahieddine's sons and the younger brother of Emir Abdelkader. He married one of his cousins, with whom he had three sons and two daughters.

In memory of his father, one of his sons was named Mahieddine, who married his cousin Zeyneb, the daughter of his uncle Emir Abdelkader.

French conquest

Mustapha strove to gain influence in the Emirate of Abdelkader and took an important part in the affairs of the Algerian country.

Sahara tribes
In 1836, Mustapha tried proclaim himself Sheikh of the Algerian Sahara tribe who had rallied to Abdelkader, but his attempt failed and he was struck with disgrace. However, he deeply apologised, so Abdelkader appointed him bey of Titteri in Médéa.

Khalifa of Médéa

When Abdelkader laid siege to the city of Tlemcen in July 1836 to liberate it from General Louis-Eugène Cavaignac, he received news that some people had tried to rally the French and to rebel against him in Médéa.

Abdelkader let an auxiliary force continue the siege of the French garrison in Tlemcen, and advanced with dozens of cavaliers to Médéa to stop the rebellion.

Abdelkader wanted give land to his younger brother Mustafa, and in turn named him khalifa of Médéa territory before returning to Tlemcen to continue the siege.

Mustapha worked to submit Titteri and Mitidja to the power of the Emirate of Abdelkader before passing the title of Bey of Titteri to his successor, Mohamed Berkani.

Revolt of Kabylia

On May 8, 1837, Mustapha organized a surprise attack on a large agricultural farm in Reghaïa to force the French occupiers to sign a cease-fire treaty with Abdelkader.

The farm, managed by settlers Mercier and Saussine, was positioned with its 3,000 hectares of area at the entrance of Kabylia which remained in sight of the sustained advance of French colonization towards the plains of Oued Isser.

Mustapha urged the marabouts of the zawiyas of the Beni Aïcha, the Issers, and the Amraoua to terrorize the French settlers to stop the invasion of the mountain range of Khachna, which precedes Djurdjura.

The first Kabyle attack on Reghaïa alarmed General Charles-Marie Denys de Damrémont, who was the military governor of Algiers. He ordered General Alexandre Charles Perrégaux and Colonel Maximilien Joseph Schauenburg to organize a punitive expedition against the Kabyles who sacked and looted the farm.

Mustapha's goal was achieved, since the colonial troops, who were to quickly join Orania in order to contribute with General Bugeaud to the defeat of Abdelkader, were maintained and posted in Algiers in order to protect it and to organize the counter-offensive against the Emirate of Abdelkader.

During the expedition of the Col des Beni Aïcha on May 17, 1837, the colonial forces lost because of bad weather, while the First Battle of Boudouaou on May 25 ended with the signing of the Treaty of Tafna on May 30.

Khalifa of M'Sila

Mustapha was later appointed in August 1839 by Abdelkader as Khalifa of the Hodna region around the M'Sila territory. As soon as he arrived in M'Sila, he headed for the Hautes Plaines in the northeast, calling all the tribes in his path to arms against the French, and in less than eight days, the insurrection became widespread.

Constantinois
At the beginning of 1840, Mustapha was commander-in-chief to the Algerian rebels that Abdelkader sent to the province of Constantine to harass the French troops.

Mustapha carried out his mission in the Constantinois region and returned to temporarily live in Medjana before returning to the traveling capital of Abdelkader.

Château d'Amboise

After Abdelkader surrendered in 1847, Mustapha accompanied him with the other members of his family to be exiled in the Château d'Amboise in France. Mustapha, along with all of his other brothers, left Amboise and settled in Morocco.

Gallery

See also
 French conquest of Algeria
 Emirate of Abdelkader
 First Raid on Reghaïa (8 May 1837)
 Expedition of the Col des Beni Aïcha (17 May 1837)
 First Battle of Boudouaou (25 May 1837)
 First Battle of the Issers (27 May 1837)
 Treaty of Tafna (30 May 1837)

Bibliography

References

1814 births
19th-century Algerian people
1863 deaths
Death in Morocco
Algerian guerrillas
Algerian resistance leaders
Exiled politicians
Algerian exiles
Algerian Sufis
Hashemite people
Algerian independence activists
People from Mascara Province